Kvareli is a town in northeastern in Kakheti Province, Georgia. Located in the Alazani Valley, near the foothills of the Greater Caucasus Mountains, it was the birthplace of Georgian author Ilia Chavchavadze, whose one-storied house is preserved as a local museum.

The area is in the center of the Kakheti wine-producing region, and the town itself is known for its Kindzmarauli wine, a semisweet red variety.

Notable people
Notable people who are from or have resided in Kvareli:
 Ilia Chavchavadze,  writer, poet.
 Kote Marjanishvili,  Georgian theater director
 Ilia Beroshvili, I.Chavchavadze Museum Director

See also
 Kakheti
 Gremi
 Tsinandali

References 

Cities and towns in Kakheti
Tiflis Governorate